This is a list of Italian constituencies from 1946 to present. For the election of the Italian Chamber of Deputies, since 1993 Italy is divided in 27 districts called circoscrizioni. However, the distribution of seats being calculated at national level, districts serve only to choose the single candidates inside the party lists. During the election of the Italian Senate, according to the Constitution, each Region is a single district, without connections at national level.

During the Regional elections, the districts correspond to the Provinces, even if some seats are allocated at regional level. For the Provincial elections, a special system is used, based on localized lists: even if the competition is disputed on provincial level, candidates are presented in single-member districts, and their final position inside each party list depends by the percentage of votes they received in their own districts. Finally, for the Communal elections no districts are used.

Electoral districts for the Chamber of Deputies from 1946 to 1994

Electoral districts for the Chamber of Deputies from 1994 to 2006

Electoral districts for the Chamber of Deputies from 2006 to 2018

Aosta Valley

Piedmont 1

Piedmont 2

Lombardy 1

Lombardy 2

Lombardy 3

Veneto 1

Veneto 2

2018 to present 

 Abruzzo (Chamber of Deputies constituency)
 Aosta Valley (Chamber of Deputies constituency)
 Apulia (Chamber of Deputies constituency)
 Basilicata (Chamber of Deputies constituency)
 Calabria (Chamber of Deputies constituency)
 Campania 1 (Chamber of Deputies constituency)
 Campania 2 (Chamber of Deputies constituency)
 Template:Chamber of Deputies constituencies in Italy
 Emilia-Romagna (Chamber of Deputies constituency)
 Friuli-Venezia Giulia (Chamber of Deputies constituency)
 Lazio 1 (Chamber of Deputies constituency)
 Lazio 2 (Chamber of Deputies constituency)
 Liguria (Chamber of Deputies constituency)
 Lombardy 1 (Chamber of Deputies constituency)
 Lombardy 2 (Chamber of Deputies constituency)
 Lombardy 3 (Chamber of Deputies constituency)
 Lombardy 4 (Chamber of Deputies constituency)
 Marche (Chamber of Deputies constituency)
 Molise (Chamber of Deputies constituency)
 Overseas (Chamber of Deputies constituency)
 Overseas (Senate of the Republic constituency)
 Piedmont 1 (Chamber of Deputies constituency)
 Piedmont 2 (Chamber of Deputies constituency)
 Sardinia (Chamber of Deputies constituency)
 Sicily 1 (Chamber of Deputies constituency)
 Sicily 2 (Chamber of Deputies constituency)
 Trentino-Alto Adige/Südtirol (Chamber of Deputies constituency)
 Tuscany (Chamber of Deputies constituency)
 Umbria (Chamber of Deputies constituency)
 Veneto 1 (Chamber of Deputies constituency)
 Veneto 2 (Chamber of Deputies constituency)

References

See also 

 Overseas constituencies of the Italian Parliament

Elections in Italy
Chamber of Deputies (Italy)
Italy
Constituencies